The name Dennis has been used for five tropical cyclones in the Atlantic Ocean and for one extratropical European windstorm. The name was removed from reuse in the Atlantic after the 2005 season, and was replaced by Don for the 2011 season.

In  the Atlantic:
Hurricane Dennis (1981), a weak storm that made landfall in Cuba and then Florida, causing moderate damage.
Tropical Storm Dennis (1987), remained in the open ocean.
Tropical Storm Dennis (1993), never threatened land.
Hurricane Dennis (1999), a Category 2 hurricane that grazed the Bahamas and stalled east of Outer Banks of North Carolina before making landfall there.
Hurricane Dennis (2005), a potent and damaging storm that made landfall in Cuba twice as a Category 4 hurricane and once in Florida as a Category 3. Formed July 4, 2005 and dissipate July 13, 2005.

In Europe:
Storm Dennis, an intense storm that affected the Republic of Ireland, the United Kingdom, and Scandinavia.

See also

 Hurricane Denise, a similar name

Atlantic hurricane set index articles